Vilhjálmur Einarsson (5 June 1934 – 28 December 2019) was an Icelandic track and field athlete, and triple-jump silver medalist at the 1956 Summer Olympics in Melbourne, Australia. Vilhjálmur grew up in the East-Icelandic fishing village of Reyðarfjörður and was the son of Einar Stefánsson and Sigríður Vilhjálmsdóttir.

In 1956 Vilhjálmur set a new Olympic Record by jumping 16.26 m in the triple jump, only to be surpassed by Brazil's Adhemar da Silva in the same competition. This was the most unexpected result of the Olympics that year, and his silver medal was Iceland's first ever Olympic medal. In 1958 he took bronze in the triple jump at the European Athletics Championships in Stockholm, Sweden, with 16.00 m. His personal best was 16.70 m set in 1960 in Laugardalsvöllur, Iceland. He was named Icelandic Sportsperson of the Year five times, more times than anyone else.

Vilhjálmur was also a headmaster of three schools: Héraðsskólinn in Laugarvatn, Reykholtsskóli in Reykholt, and Menntaskólinn in Egilsstaðir, where he later worked as a part-time mathematics teacher. He also was a painter, specializing in landscape painting, and his work has been on display in several art galleries in Iceland.

He attended Dartmouth College. His son Einar Vilhjálmsson later represented Iceland in the men's javelin throw at the Summer Olympics (1984, 1988 and 1992).

References

1934 births
2019 deaths
Dartmouth College alumni
Vilhjálmur Einarsson
Vilhjálmur Einarsson
Vilhjálmur Einarsson
Landscape artists
Athletes (track and field) at the 1956 Summer Olympics
Athletes (track and field) at the 1960 Summer Olympics
Vilhjálmur Einarsson
Vilhjálmur Einarsson
European Athletics Championships medalists
Medalists at the 1956 Summer Olympics
Olympic silver medalists in athletics (track and field)